Thomas Dabridgecourt (c. 1546 – 3 November 1614), of Horwoods, Preston Candover, Hampshire, was an English politician.

He was a Member (MP) of the Parliament of England for Hindon in 1571 and for Dorchester in 1593.

References

1546 births
1614 deaths
Members of the Parliament of England for Dorchester
English MPs 1571
People from Hindon, Wiltshire
English MPs 1593
People from Preston Candover